The Kerala Film Critics Association Award for Best Popular Film is an award presented annually at the Kerala Film Critics Association Awards of India to the most popular film in Malayalam. It was first awarded as a special prize in 1991. It is almost a regular category of the award since 2002.

Winners

See also
 Kerala Film Critics Association Award for Best Film
 Kerala Film Critics Association Award for Second Best Film
 Kerala State Film Award for Best Popular Film

References

Film
Awards for best film